The church of Surp Astvatsatsin (meaning Holy Mother of God) is located just off of the main highway through the village of Karbi in the Aragatsotn Province of Armenia. The basilica was completed between the years of 1691–1693, while the belfry was built earlier in 1338.

Architecture 
S. Astvatsatsin is a triple-nave basilica, with a single gable roof covering the entire body of the structure and a small off-centered cupola. Several large khachkars are embedded into the exterior walls of the church. A large two-storey belfry it situated in front of the eastern end of the church. The belfry is a separate structure from the basilica. It has a large archway that serves as the support for the upper cupola. The cupola is supported by eight columns and has a conical dome above.

Gallery

References

Bibliography

External links 

Churches completed in 1693
Armenian Apostolic churches in Armenia
Tourist attractions in Aragatsotn Province
Churches in Aragatsotn Province
1693 establishments in Iran
17th-century Oriental Orthodox church buildings
17th-century churches in Armenia